Fissidens exilis is a species of moss belonging to the family Fissidentaceae.

It has cosmopolitan distribution.

References

Dicranales